Frank P. Morse is a California businessman and attorney. His clientele previously  included aviator and industrialist Howard Hughes, Saudi businessman Adnan Khashoggi and American businessman and intelligence agent Larry J. Kolb.

Biography
Morse graduated Phi Beta Kappa from Stanford University, in Palo Alto, California. In 1962, while an undergraduate at Stanford, Morse was one of the civil rights workers kidnapped in Mississippi while helping to register black voters during the Civil Rights Movement. Severely beaten in Mississippi, he later returned to Stanford to resume and complete his undergraduate studies. Dave Barnum composed and wrote a song about the exploits of Morse in Italy, called the "Frank Morse Talkin' Blues", which won the 1964 Stanford University Spring Sing

He received his law degree from Harvard Law School in Cambridge, Massachusetts. Morse went on to teach at University of Southern California and at University of California, Irvine. He is married to Rio Morse and has three children.

History with Howard Hughes
In his late twenties, Morse became general counsel to Howard R. Hughes and Summa Corporation, and a member of the board of directors of Summa Corporation.  Hughes learned about Morse in a Los Angeles Times article --- one in which Morse was described as an indomitable young attorney who had just won fifty-two cases in a row. "Get me that lawyer!" Hughes is reported to have shouted to his chief of staff. In addition to being Chief Legal Officer for the umbrella corporation for the holdings of Howard Hughes, Morse served as legal counsel to the President of Summa Corporation which had businesses ranging from airlines, to helicopter manufacturing, to resort hotels.  Morse is still legal counsel to the estate of Howard Hughes, which remains open.

History with Adnan Khashoggi
In the 1980s and 1990s, as a partner in the law firm Sandler, Rolnick & Morse, Morse served as Chief Legal Advisor for Adnan Khashoggi in the United States and Europe. Morse was responsible for complex litigation and business transactions for Khashoggi, personally, and for Khashoggi's Triad Group of Companies.

History with Larry J. Kolb
Morse was the attorney for Larry Kolb during, among other times, the American businessman and intelligence operative's troubles which stemmed from Kolb's involvement in the St. Kitt's Affair, a political imbroglio involving Kolb's friend, Indian prime minister Rajiv Gandhi, and various cabinet members of the government of India. Kolb credits Morse with being the brightest attorney he ever met and the one who taught him the real meaning of "personal knowledge" of evidence.

Finance and Acquisitions
In the early 1980s, Morse was President of Group Resources Management, a Southern California consulting business with emphasis on venture capital financing and acquisitions. He also maintained his private practice of law with emphasis on general corporate matters and complex litigation.

From 1996-2003, Morse was Chairman of the Board of BLI Holdings Corp., a company financed and partially owned by Bain Capital. The company was a contract manufacturer for Paul Mitchell Systems and Victoria's Secret and other cosmetic and hair care products in the United States. The company had approximately 1,000 employees and gross revenues of over one hundred and thirty million dollars when it was sold for a significant profit in 2003.

Morse was Chairman of the Board of Cielo Unlimited, a California Holding Company. He is actively involved in seeking private investment opportunities, primarily in leveraged buyouts of existing companies.

H&G Capital Advisors
In 2007, Morse was named a Managing Director of H&G Capital Advisors.  H&G Capital Advisors is part of Huntsman Gay Global Capital.  With its principal offices located in Palo Alto, California, this new private equity fund was started by Jon M. Huntsman, the famed Utah industrialist and philanthropist, and Robert C. Gay, the long-time Managing Director of Bain Capital and former chief of staff of Howard Hughes.  H&G focuses on middle market leveraged buyouts, growth capital investments, restructurings and strategic investment in mid-cap public companies.  The Fund has in excess of $1 billion in limited partner commitments.

References

 Boyles, Denis, "Lawyers, Guns & Money," Vanity Fair, December, 1989
 Kolb, Larry J.  OVERWORLD: The Life and Times of a Reluctant Spy. (Riverhead Books, New York, 2004).

Year of birth missing (living people)
Living people
American lawyers
Stanford University alumni
Harvard Law School alumni
University of Southern California faculty
University of California, Irvine faculty